.exe is a common filename extension denoting an executable file (the main execution point of a computer program) for Microsoft Windows, OS/2, and DOS.

File formats 
There are numerous file formats which may be used by a file with a  extension.

DOS 
16-bit DOS MZ executable (MZ)The original DOS executable file format. These formats can be identified by the letters "MZ" at the beginning of the file in ASCII. All later formats have an MZ DOS stub header.
16-bit New Executable (NE) Introduced with the multitasking MS-DOS 4.0 and also used by 16-bit OS/2 and Windows, NE can be identified by the "NE" in ASCII.

OS/2 

32-bit Linear Executable (LX) Introduced with OS/2 2.0, these can be identified by the "LX" in ASCII. These can only be run by OS/2 2.0 and higher. Some DOS extenders also use this format.
Mixed 16/32-bit Linear Executable (LE) Introduced with OS/2 2.0, these can be identified by the "LE" in ASCII. VxD drivers on Windows 3.x, OS/2, and Windows 9x, as well as some DOS extenders use this format.

Windows 

32-bit Portable Executable (PE) Introduced with Windows NT, they are fat binaries consisting of a DOS-specific and a Windows-specific part. The DOS-specific part (dubbed DOS stub) is a legitimate 16-bit DOS program. Microsoft C++ linker, by default, uses a minimal DOS stub that prints the following message: "This program cannot be run in DOS mode." Windows ignores the DOS stub and executes the Windows-specific portion that starts with the "PE\0\0" ASCII sequence (letters "PE" and two null bytes). It is possible to link other, more function DOS stubs. Indeed, there are a few such dual programs, such as regedit in Windows 95 and old versions of WinZIP self extractors.
64-bit Portable Executable (PE32+) Introduced by 64-bit versions of Windows, this is a PE file with wider fields. In most cases, code can be written to simply work as either a 32 or 64-bit PE file. This file also includes a DOS stub.

Other 

There are other EXE formats, including but not limited to W3 (a collection of LE files, only used in WIN386.EXE), W4 (a compressed collection of LE files, only used in VMM32.VXD), DL, MP, P2, P3 (last three used by Phar Lap extenders).

See also 
 Comparison of executable file formats
 Executable compression
 IExpress
 
 CMD file (CP/M)
 Windows Installer files (msi)

References

Further reading

External links 
 Dependency Walker
 MZ EXE header format
 PE Explorer

DOS files
DOS technology
Executable file formats
Filename extensions
Windows administration